Masnuy-Saint-Jean is a village of Wallonia and a district of the municipality of Jurbise, located in the province of Hainaut, Belgium.

Former municipalities of Hainaut (province)